Stav Nachmani is an Israeli footballer who plays Hapoel Hadera.

Career
Nachmani started his career his career in Maccabi Tel Aviv's youth team, and signed for Maccabi Haifa when he was 15.

On 30 May 2020 Nachmani made his senior debut in the 1–2 loss to Hapoel Tel Aviv.

In summer 2021 loaned to Hapoel Nof HaGalil. On 11 September 2021 scored his career debut goal in the 3–1 win against Maccabi Netanya

References

External links
 

2002 births
Living people
Israeli footballers
Footballers from Modi'in-Maccabim-Re'ut
Maccabi Haifa F.C. players
Hapoel Nof HaGalil F.C. players
Beitar Jerusalem F.C. players
Hapoel Hadera F.C. players
Israeli Premier League players
Israeli people of Moroccan-Jewish descent
Association football forwards